"Chainsaw" is a song recorded by American country music group The Band Perry. It was released on March 3, 2014 as the fourth single from their second album, Pioneer. The song was written by Shane McAnally, Josh Osborne and Matthew Ramsey.To date, this is The Band Perry’s final Top 10 hit.

Co-writer Matthew Ramsey originally recorded the song with his band Old Dominion.

Content
"Chainsaw" is a song about a woman who, when jilted by her lover, destroys a tree into which the two carved their initials.

Critical reception
Giving it a "B+", Tammy Ragusa of Country Weekly said that the song "casts the Perry siblings in a fiercer light" and was "clever, groovy, hooky, and fun".

Music video
The music video for "Chainsaw" was filmed at two locations in Oregon: Silver Falls State Park near Silverton and the Bottle Factory, a local bar in Stayton. It was directed by David McClister and premiered in May 2014.

Chart performance

Year-end charts

References

2014 singles
The Band Perry songs
Republic Nashville singles
Songs written by Shane McAnally
Songs written by Josh Osborne
Song recordings produced by Dann Huff
2013 songs
Republic Records singles
Songs written by Matthew Ramsey
Songs about trees